The New Democratic Party of Canada ran a full slate of candidates in the 1997 federal election, and won 21 seats out of 301 to emerge as the fourth-largest party in the House of Commons of Canada. Many of the party's candidates have their own biography pages; information about others may be found here.

Quebec

Brome—Missisquoi: Nicole Guillemet
Nicole Guillemet was born in Paris, France. She was a social worker in 1997. She received 781 votes (1.72%), finishing fourth against Liberal Party incumbent Denis Paradis. In 2007, she was listed as a member of the Memphremagog Caregiver's Network.

Richelieu: Sylvain Pelletier

Sylvain Pelletier was a labour-relations consultant.  He received 1,028 votes (2.13%), finishing fourth against Bloc Québécois incumbent Louis Plamondon.

Ontario

Eglinton—Lawrence: Sam Savona

Savona is a veteran political organizer for Canadians with disabilities.  In 1986, he criticized the federal government of Brian Mulroney for taking insufficient steps to promote job equity for women, the disabled, visible minorities and native Canadians.  Two years later, as spokesperson for the group People Using Self-Help, he criticized the Toronto Transit Commission for taking insufficient steps to address the needs of the disabled.  He served as co-chair of the Trans-Action Coalition in the early 1990s, fighting for better access to transportation services.  He was also a prominent member of the Tenants' Rights Advocacy Project, established in 1992.  Savona himself has cerebral palsy and uses a wheelchair. In 1996, he opposed plans by the Ontario government of Mike Harris to introduce fingerprinting for welfare recipients.

He campaigned for New Democratic Party in Eglinton—Lawrence in 1997, after unsuccessfully seeking its nomination in St. Paul's.  He received 3,955 votes (9.02%), finishing third against Liberal incumbent Joe Volpe.  He was thirty-eight years old, and is believed to have been the first person with cerebral palsy to seek election in Canada.  His campaign focused on jobs, health services and education.

Savona has written against Saskatchewan farmer Robert Latimer's decision to kill his severely disabled daughter, an act that some in the Canadian media described as a mercy killing.  He has noted that doctors once told his own parents he would suffer from intellectual disabilities as an adult, and that this did not occur.  Savona has written, "What Robert Latimer did is simple: He murdered his daughter. I am living proof that you can't say what tomorrow will bring."

As of 2006, Savona is a member of the TTC's disability advisory committee.

In 2007 Savona received the city of Toronto's "Unsung Hero" award.

In March, 2011, Sam was elected as the Chair for the TTC Advisory Committee on Accessible Transportation (ACAT).

On October 17, 2013 Savona was awarded the Ontario Medal for Good Citizenship.

Parry Sound—Muskoka: Carl Wirth
Carl Wirth was a telephone technician during the election, having worked for Bell Canada since 1983. He is active in the labour movement and has held several executive positions with the Communications, Energy and Paperworkers Union of Canada (CEP) Local 39. He has also fought against deregulation, cutbacks to social services, poverty, and child labour.

Wirth joined the Parry Sound—Muskoka NDP association in 1989 and worked on several campaigns. Fifty-two years old in 1997, he acknowledged he had no change of winning the riding. He received 1,700 votes (3.98%), finishing fourth against Liberal incumbent Andy Mitchell.

St. Catharines: Ed Gould
Gould was educated at Niagara College, and worked as a millwright for General Motors. A veteran of the labour movement, he served as acting president of the Canadian Auto Workers Local 199 (Buffalo News, 26 February 1999) and participated in "Days of Action" protests against the provincial government of Mike Harris in the late 1990s (Canada NewsWire, 7 April 1998). Gould has also served as recording secretary of the Niagara Falls Regional Skilled Trades Council and president of the St. Catharines labour council.

He received 4,657 votes (9.60%) in 1997, finishing fourth against Liberal incumbent Walt Lastewka.

Scarborough Southwest: Dave Gracey
Gracey began his professional career as a foreign service officer, and later worked as a high school teacher and principal. He had retired by the time of the 1997 election (Toronto Star, 30 May 1997). During the 1980s, he served as chair of the Scarborough Peace Association (Toronto Star, 23 June 1987).

He sought election to the Legislative Assembly of Ontario for Scarborough Centre in the 1975 and 1977 Ontario elections, as a candidate of the provincial New Democratic Party. He came close to winning in 1975, but lost to Progressive Conservative candidate Frank Drea on both occasions.

Gracey campaigned for the federal NDP in Scarborough West in 1984 and 1988, and in Scarborough Southwest in 1997. He lost to Progressive Conservative Reg Stackhouse on the first occasion, and to Liberal Tom Wappel on the latter two. In 1988, he defeated Judy Rebick for the Scarborough West NDP nomination (Toronto Star, 19 April 1988).

Following his defeat in 1988, he said that the NDP had made a serious mistake by not focusing more of its attention on opposition to the Canada-United States Free Trade Agreement (Toronto Star, 24 November 1988). Gracey was 48 years old at the time of this election (Toronto Star, 16 November 1988).

He wrote an article in 2004 arguing that temporary deficits, while not desirable, can be appropriate for some economic situations. He has also proposed that the Bank of Canada be given more authority in Canada's economic system.

Gracey continues to serve on the executive of the Scarborough Southwest NDP association as of 2005, and has endorsed Dan Harris as the party's candidate in the 39th Canadian federal election.

There is a different politician named Dave Gracey in British Columbia.

Sudbury: John Filo

John Filo is a former geophysics teacher at Cambrian College, and a longtime labour leader and social activist in Sudbury.  He holds a Bachelor of Science, Master of Arts and P.Eng degrees, and has worked in South Africa, Botswana, Saudi Arabia and Europe.  His father was a working-class immigrant from Slovakia, who worked in the steel industry.

Filo served as president of the Sudbury and District Labour Council in the 1990s and 2000s, and led protests against the labour policies of Mike Harris's provincial government.  In 1995, he called for a boycott of local businesses that were identified as anti-labour.  He nevertheless opposed a "Day of Action" protest against the Harris government slated for February 1997, due to both harsh winter conditions and opposition from the United Steelworkers of America.

A longtime New Democratic Party supporter, Filo ran as a party candidate in 1997 on the advice of Elie Martel, a candidate in the neighbouring riding of Nickel Belt.  Martel noted that Filo's candidacy was meant to keep the Liberal Party election machine in Sudbury busy, and prevent it from intervening in his own campaign; Filo himself acknowledged that this was true.  Filo received 8,471 votes (21.12%), finishing second against Liberal incumbent Diane Marleau.

Filo was a co-chair of the Sudbury United Way campaign in 1999-2000.  He continued to oppose the Harris government's policies, describing the 2000 Employment Standards Act as an affront to working men and women.  In 2002, he opposed the provincial government's plans to privatize Ontario Hydro.

He was honoured for his contribution to Sudbury in 2007, in a meeting at the city's Steelworkers' Hall.  He was 72 years old at the time.

Lambton-Kent-Middlesex: Bela Trebics
Bela "Bill" Trebics was a Wallaceburg labourer and an instructor on workplace health and safety issues for his union, UAW local 251. He ran for the only time in 1997, improving the NDP's standing in his riding from fifth to fourth place and increasing their share of the vote to 5.44%.

Manitoba

Glen Hallick (Portage—Lisgar)
Hallick graduated from Sanford Collegiate in 1983, and later received a Bachelor of Arts degree from the University of Manitoba. He was a part-time employee of the Rural Municipality of Macdonald during the campaign..

Hallick had previously been a candidate of the New Democratic Party of Manitoba in the 1995 provincial election, in the rural constituency of Morris. He finished third with 1,158 votes, against Frank Pitura of the Progressive Conservative Party. In the 1997 federal election, he received 2,420 votes (7.20%) to finish fourth against Jake Hoeppner of the Reform Party.

At the 2001 Manitoba NDP convention, Hallick was one of the most vocal advocates of a return to the monopoly hog marketing board system removed by the previous PC government (Winnipeg Free Press, 11 February 2001). The motion was defeated.

Hallick is a freelance writer who has written for the Morris, MB. based Crow Wing Warrior and Scrathing River Post, the Headliner (then owned by Transcontinental Media) and currently the Carman-based Valley Leader.

Martha Wiebe Owen (Provencher)

Martha Wiebe Owen is a housewife and activist in Pinawa, and has been a candidate for the New Democratic Party at both the federal and provincial levels.

She called for the NDP to promote more co-operation with small business at its 1994 national convention.  She appeared before the Manitoba meetings of the House of Commons of Canada finance committee in 1994 and 1995, and engaged in a tense verbal exchange with committee chair Jim Peterson on the latter occasion.  Owen supported Herschel Hardin's bid to lead the federal New Democratic Party in 1995.

Owen has written letters in support of the Canadian Wheat Board, shorter working weeks, and a fair minimum wage.  She endorsed the NDP's decision to offer parliamentary support to the Liberal government of Paul Martin in 2005, arguing that the arrangement would force the Liberals to pass good legislation.  As of 2008, Owen serves on the Manitoba Council on Aging.

Kathleen McCallum (Selkirk—Interlake)

McCallum was a researcher at the time of the election, and had previously been a candidate for the New Democratic Party of Manitoba in the 1990 provincial election.  Considered a serious contender in 1997, she finished third in a narrow three-way contest.  She later worked as an assistant to the provincial Minister of Agriculture and Food, and as of 2007 is a project manager for Manitoba Competitiveness, Training and Trade.

Saskatchewan

Walter Kyliuk (Wanuskewin)

Kyliuk was a school principal in the small town of Radisson before running for office.  In 1988, he took part in a civic mission to Toronto to solicit funding for a hockey arena and community hall to save the community from destitution (Toronto Star, 21 July 1988).  The efforts were eventually successful.  Kyliuk was awarded a "laurel" by the Toronto Star newspaper for his actions (23 July), and Ken Dryden mentioned the initiative in his book, The Game (6 January 1990).

He received 8,793 votes (26.79%) in the 1997 election, finishing second against Reform Party candidate Maurice Vellacott.

In 2004, Kyliuk took part in protests to preserve Radisson's public school (Saskatoon Star-Phoenix, 20 July 2004).

In December 2004, Walter Kyliuk was part of the Canadian team of election observers who took part in the re-run of the Ukrainian Presidential Election.

References